Peter Charles Lewis (born July 15, 1945) is one of the founding members of the band Moby Grape. Three of his better known songs with Moby Grape are "Fall on You" and "Sitting by the Window" from the self-titled first Moby Grape album and "If You Can't Learn from My Mistakes" from Moby Grape '69.

Background 
Peter is the younger of the two sons of actress Loretta Young (1913-2000) and writer-producer Tom Lewis (d. 1988), and accordingly spent much of his childhood in Hollywood. His older brother Christopher Lewis (1944–2021) was a writer and producer of films primarily for television. The Lewis brothers are nephews of Young's sisters, actresses Polly Ann Young and Sally Blane. They are also half-brothers of Judy Lewis (d.2011), daughter of Loretta Young and Clark Gable. Musician David Lindley is their cousin.

As a youth, Lewis attended military school; after a stint in the Air Force, he became a commercial pilot, initially working for Shell Oil. As for his musical career, Lewis cites Tim Hardin and Fred Neil as important influences, and credits Linda McCartney (née Eastman) with introducing him to their music.

Moby Grape: Lewis’ Sensitivity to Mosley’s and Spence’s Challenges 
Beyond his work as a musician, Lewis has been noted for his efforts in assisting fellow Moby Grape bandmates Bob Mosley and Skip Spence (d. 1999) in battling the challenges of schizophrenia. Lewis has a personal sensitivity to psychiatric challenges. At age 11, while his parents were embroiled in an acrimonious divorce and custody dispute, he suffered a nervous breakdown in New York City and was involuntarily hospitalized for a period. As of 1969, he recalls, "I was under the care of a psychiatrist, taking all this Librium so I could stay with the band."

Mosley credits Lewis with helping him end approximately five years of homelessness in the 1990s. Mosley describes the circumstances as follows: "In 1996, Peter Lewis picked me up along the side of a San Diego freeway where I was living, to tell me a ruling by San Francisco Judge Garcia gave Moby Grape their name back. I was ready to go to work again."

With respect to Spence, Lewis was skeptical about him being labeled a schizophrenic because recognized treatments were not resulting in any noticeable improvements. As a result, Lewis sought and participated in alternative healing therapies with Spence involving metaphysics. "Through my dad, who'd become a born-again Christian, I'd met these monks in Lucia above Big Sur, who were really serious about rational metaphysics. Their faith beyond reason overwhelms you every time. Since the doctors couldn't help Skippy - they kept objectifying his problem: 'He's a paranoid schizophrenic' and were never going to heal him. All they were interested in was keeping him out of McDonald's with a machine gun, so it (the monastery) was the only place I could think of to take him."

Recent career 
In recent years, in addition to performing occasionally with Moby Grape, Lewis was a guitarist with the reformed Electric Prunes (2000–2003), contributing to their Artifact album. He has also developed a career as a solo artist. He has released three albums on the Taxim label: Peter Lewis, Peter Lewis with David West Live in Bremen and Peter Lewis with David West Live at the Lobero Theatre. Peter Lewis occasionally performs as a duo with David West, his collaborator on Live in Bremen and "Live at the Lobero Theatre."

In 2010, Lewis appeared with Stu Cook at the SXSW festival, performing with The Explosives.

As of 2011, Lewis has been writing songs and performing with poet M.L. Liebler.

Solo discography 
Peter Lewis (1995)
Live in Bremen (2003, with David West)
"Live at the Lobero Theatre" (2013, with David West)
Just Like Jack (2017)
The Road To Zion (2019)

References

External links 
Peter Lewis unofficial MySpace page
Play Ball! Musical Services David West
Artifact Electric Prunes, 2001; review by Keith Hannaleck, 2002.

1945 births
American rock musicians
American people of Luxembourgian descent
Songwriters from California
People from Hollywood, Los Angeles
Living people
Moby Grape members